Santiago Fosgt (born 27 March 1986 in Buenos Aires) is an Argentine footballer currently playing for El Tanque Sisley of the Uruguayan Primera División.

Teams
  Patronato de Paraná 2004–2005
  Juventud Las Piedras 2005–2008
  Danubio 2008–2009
  Fénix 2009–2011
  Colón de Santa Fe 2011–2013
  Patronato de Paraná 2013–2014
  El Tanque Sisley 2014-

External links
 
 

1986 births
Living people
Argentine footballers
Argentine expatriate footballers
Club Atlético Patronato footballers
Club Atlético Colón footballers
Centro Atlético Fénix players
Juventud de Las Piedras players
Danubio F.C. players
Argentine Primera División players
Expatriate footballers in Uruguay
Association footballers not categorized by position
Footballers from Buenos Aires